Angela Franke (born 18 November 1957) is a retired German swimmer. She competed at the 1972 Summer Olympics in the 400 m individual medley, but failed to reach the final.

Between 1973 and 1975 she won two gold, two silver and one bronze medals in various freestyle and medley events at the world and European championships. On 18 August 1973 she set a world record in the 400 m individual medley at 5:01.10, and two weeks later, at the 1973 World Aquatics Championships, improved it to 5:00.37; yet she lost to her teammate Gudrun Wegner who swam 4:57.51.

References

External links 

 
 

1957 births
Living people
German female swimmers
German female freestyle swimmers
German female medley swimmers
Olympic swimmers of East Germany
Swimmers at the 1972 Summer Olympics
Sportspeople from Magdeburg
World Aquatics Championships medalists in swimming
European Aquatics Championships medalists in swimming
20th-century German women
21st-century German women